This article is a list of diseases of carnations (Dianthus caryophylium).

Bacterial diseases

Fungal diseases

Nematodes, parasitic

Viral diseases

References 

 Common Names of Diseases, The American Phytopathological Society

Diseases
Carnation
Carnation